Eliane Brum (born May 1966, in Ijuí) is a Brazilian journalist, writer and documentarist. She graduated from the Pontifical Catholic University of Rio Grande do Sul (PUC / RS) in 1988 and has written for Zero Hora, Época and El País and won more than 40 international awards for reporting, among them the Premio Rey de España and the Inter American Associated Press Award. She is married to British journalist Jonathan Watts.

Brum is the author of a novel - Uma Duas (published in English by AmazonCrossing as One Two - three feature news stories books: Coluna Prestes - O Avesso da Lenda, A Vida que Ninguém Vê (which was awarded in 2007 the Prêmio Jabuti) and O Olho da Rua - and A Menina Quebrada, a collection of columns written by her in Época magazine's website. She participated in the Doctors without Borders compilation of special reports Dignity !, which also included authors such as Mario Vargas Llosa. She is co-director of three documentaries: Severina's Story, Gretchen Filme Estrada, and Laerte-se.

References

External links
 Elian Brum's official page (in Portuguese)
Portal dos Jornalistas - Eliane Brum
Revista Época - Eliane Brum
El País - Eliane Brum

1966 births
Brazilian journalists
Brazilian women writers
Living people
Pontifical Catholic University of Rio Grande do Sul alumni